Adams Park is an association football stadium in High Wycombe, Buckinghamshire, England. Built in 1990, it is the home ground of the local Wycombe Wanderers in League One. It was also leased from 2002 to 2014 to the rugby union club London Wasps from Aviva Premiership, and from 2016 to 2020 to the Reading F.C. Women football club. From the 2003/04 season to the 2005/06 season, the stadium was officially called Causeway Stadium, named after its sponsor Causeway Technologies.

History

Pre-construction
Wycombe Wanderers had sought to leave their home ground at Loakes Park since the 1960s as the site had been earmarked for the site of development of the adjacent Wycombe Hospital. The club were able to sell the land to the health authority, which almost solely funded the construction of Adams Park.

Opening
The ground is located in a valley at the end of the Sands Industrial Estate, surrounded by green hills on three sides. Whereas Wycombe's previous Loakes Park ground was very close to the town centre, Adams Park is two miles due west of High Wycombe and less easily accessible either by public or private transport.

The stadium was opened in time for the 1990–91 season, and had a capacity of 6,000 with 1,267 seats in the Main Stand. The ground was named Adams Park in honour of benefactor and former captain Frank Adams. Adams had bought the former ground Loakes Park for the club, whose sale financed the move to the stadium named after him. The new stadium coincided with an upturn in the club's fortunes as, under manager Martin O'Neill, they won the FA Trophy at Wembley thanks to a 2–1 win over Kidderminster Harriers.

Renovations

1990s
The initial licensed capacity of Adams Park was 6,000. This gradually rose as Wycombe Wanderers improved the provision of crush barriers on the terraces. Shortly after entering the Football League for the first time in 1993, these upgrades were completed, taking the capacity to around 9,500. In the summer of 1996 the 4,990-seater Woodlands Stand was built on the hill behind the erstwhile Woodlands Terrace. The Hillbottom Road End, where the visiting fans are accommodated, was seated, reducing its capacity from 2,131 standing spaces to 1,049 seats. The latter development had created problems when large numbers of visiting fans came to the ground, outstripping the supply of seats in that end when sides like Watford, Birmingham City and Manchester City visited. The capacity of the stadium was fixed at 10,000 to comply with council regulations, as the positioning of the stadium on a dead-end road was leading to problems when large crowds were leaving the ground, particularly with parking cars in the streets of the nearby residential suburb of Sands.

2001
In the summer of 2001 the Hillbottom Road End was extended by an extra 977 seats to take its capacity to 2,026. This was done mainly to be able to accommodate more away fans in one place when the need arose. However, the capacity was kept at 10,000 by reducing the official capacity of the standing areas at the Valley End and on the paddock in front of the Main Stand.

2002
In 2002, rugby union team London Wasps (later just known as Wasps), became tenants to Wycombe Wanderers at Adams Park after losing their previous groundsharing agreement with Queens Park Rangers at Loftus Road.

2005
In July 2005, a capacity crowd of 10,000 was registered for the first time, when Premiership champions Chelsea brought a team to play Wycombe in a pre-season friendly. It was during this season that the idea that Adams Park would be further expanded was mooted by senior figures at Wycombe Wanderers and Wasps so that it can comply to the Rugby Football Union regulations for Premiership grounds in the future. These stipulated that stadiums would have a capacity of at least 12,000 by 2007/08. It was initially suggested that a stand identical to the Woodlands Stand be built where the Main Stand is currently situated, and options to add additional tiers to the Valley End of the ground were also discussed. These plans, however, never came to fruition, as the RFU's requirement to increase the capacity of the grounds was quietly dropped soon afterwards after a general decline in attendances, as well as the major difficulties that would have arisen from trying to add additional access routes to the stadium.

2013
On 6 March 2013, Adams Park hosted rugby league for the first time after London Broncos were forced to move their game against Bradford to High Wycombe due to pitch problems at their usual home ground the Twickenham Stoop.

On 21 March 2013, it hosted an England national under-21 football team international friendly against Romania's under-21s with the hosts beat the visitors 3–0 goals from Wilfried Zaha, Jack Robinson and Nathan Delfouneso with 6,354 in attendance.

2014
On 8 October 2014, it was announced that Wasps would leave Adams Park by December 2014, ending their 12-year ground-share with Wycombe Wanderers. They purchased and moved to the larger Ricoh Arena in Coventry.

New name
In 2003 the stadium was renamed the Causeway Stadium. For £100,000 over three years, local technology company Causeway bought the naming rights to the ground. This caused some anger amongst fans as the ground was named Adams Park in honour of benefactor and former captain Frank Adams. Adams had bought the former ground Loakes Park for the club, whose sale financed the move to the stadium named after him. The Causeway Technologies sponsorship expired at the end of the 2005–06 season and the ground name has reverted to Adams Park.

New development plans
There have been a number of plans to either extend the capacity of Adams Park beyond the current permitted maximum of 10,000 on the current site since Adams Park was opened, or to build a new stadium elsewhere in High Wycombe.

2005
Wycombe District Council outlined long-term plans for the regeneration of the Abbey Barn area of the town. These included a possible 20,000 capacity stadium near the site of the since-closed Wycombe Heights dry ski slope.

2006

Plans were drawn up for a new access route to the ground through land owned by the wealthy Dashwood family to the north and west of Adams Park, allowing the expansion of its capacity up to 15,000. Wasps announced proposals to build an additional two tiers of seating on the back of the existing Valley End terrace, with this structure filling in the corner round to the large Woodlands Stand, enclosing that section of the ground.

2006 saw the construction of new club shop and offices.

2007

At a Wycombe Wanderers supporters' forum, CEO and minority shareholder of Wycombe Wanderers, and owner of London Wasps Steve Hayes announced plans to build a new stadium in the High Wycombe area, with a capacity of 17,000 – 20,000 and being the first UK stadium in modern times to have terracing. The new stadium would be jointly owned by WWFC, London Wasps and Wycombe District Council. The plans included retail outlets, a hotel and conference facilities.

Steve Hayes would later become 100% owner of Wycombe Wanderers in 2008.

2008

The stadium land was taken out of the Green Belt by a Government inspector, meaning the land value rose from £4,000 per acre to £1,000,000 per acre, giving a better resale value if required. The move would also allow additional stands, permanent or temporary, to be constructed to gain the 12,500 capacity required by London Wasps under Guinness Premiership regulations for the coming season. However, the main problem of access still remained, which meant that London Wasps would still be looking to move to a larger stadium.

2011

Steve Hayes, who owned both Wycombe Wanderers F.C. and London Wasps R.U.F.C. at the time, announced his intentions to build a new stadium for both clubs on the site of Wycombe Air Park in Booker, 2½ miles away from Adams Park. His plans encountered large-scale opposition from community groups and Wycombe Wanderers supporters, with concerns ranging from the loss of aeronautical activity at the air park to inappropriate green belt development. There were also objections by many Wycombe Wanderers supporters and Wycombe Wanderers Supporters' Trust who believed the club would not receive the proceeds of the sale of Adams Park (which it owned 100%), but that these would go to Steve Hayes to help finance a 20,000-capacity stadium in conjunction with Wycombe District Council that would then be rented to Wycombe Wanderers. 
The plans were abandoned in July 2011 when Wycombe District Council decided to end its support of the project in the face of increased scepticism about the viability of the project.

Structure

PreSonus Stand (North)

Built in 1990, the stand has a capacity of 1,267, all seated (but spectators may stand in the paddock at the front of this stand if they already have a valid seat ticket). The stand also contains the club offices, changing rooms, club shop and catering facilities.

Troo Stand (East)
Originally called the Hillbottom Road End, the east end of the stadium was originally a terrace with a capacity of 2,131 when Adams Park was opened in 1990, almost identical to the Valley End at the opposite end of the ground. Along with the construction of the new Woodlands stand in 1996, 1,047 seats were installed in the Hillbottom Road End. In 2002, the capacity was increased in size to the current 2,053 all-seated capacity, with a space for 10 wheelchairs. Supporters of the visiting team are allocated this stand for Wycombe Wanderers matches.
After a number of crowd disturbances from supporters of visiting clubs who had sold out the full allocation of tickets, the licensed capacity of the stand has been reduced to 1,800. 
The stand has been renamed a number of times after commercial deals – the current official name is the Troo Stand.

Frank Adams Stand (South)
Originally a single level terrace, this stand was expanded into a two-tier unit in 1996. When redeveloped in 1996, the stand had a capacity of 4,990 (2,842 in the upper tier, 1,738 plus 50 wheelchair spaces in the lower tier) the South Stand contains boxes for corporate hospitality, with the lower tier designated as the stadium's Family Stand.

This side of the ground is also known as the Woodlands side of the ground, but was renamed to its current official name, Frank Adams Stand, to ensure that at least some of stadium would still be named in honour of the former Wycombe Wanderers' captain and benefactor when the stadium was renamed Causeway Stadium between 2003 and 2006. Since the stadium changed its name back to Adams Park, the stand has officially retained the Frank Adams name.
In the summer of 2017, the end blocks of the lower tier had a total of 163 seats removed, replaced with a tarpaulin bearing an advertisement for a club sponsor. However, in 2018, the club installed 68 '20/20' seats at the empty block nearest to the Valley End. These were installed to showcase a new type of seating accommodation that would allow spectators to stand in front of their seat without blocking someone sitting behind them. The capacity of the stand has been reduced to 4,895 following these changes.

The Bill Turnbull Gantry
The gantry at the back of the Frank Adams Stand was renamed in September 2022 in honour of the late broadcaster Bill Turnbull, who had supported Wycombe and previously used to commentate on fixtures from the position.

BMI Healthcare Terrace (West)

Originally called the Valley End, the BMI Healthcare Terrace is the home supporters' end for football matches, and the only remaining standing accommodation in the stadium. The original licensed capacity of the terrace was 2,136; however, this was reduced by the club to 1,717 to maintain a total licensed capacity for the whole stadium of 10,000 after the extension of the Hillbottom Road end by 1,000 seats in 2001. After the Sports Grounds Safety Authority re-evaluated the extent of the viewing area on the Valley End that was permitted to be included in the total capacity calculation in October 2015, the terrace's maximum capacity was provisionally reduced from 2,131 (officially licensed 1,717) to 1,494 pending remedial work to be carried out by the club in the near future.

Facilities
The stadium contains two hospitality suites, the Caledonian Suite, located behind the Beechdean Stand, and the Woodlands Suite, situated on the Executive Box level of the Frank Adams Stand.

The ground also contains a bar, called Monty's (named after late club president Monty Seymour), and since 2006 a club shop in the corner of the ground between the PreSonus and Troo stands.

Significant matches
17 November 1992 – England U19s 2–1 Turkey U19s
16 November 2005 – England U19s 2–0 Switzerland U19s
6 March 2006 – FA Women's Premier League Cup final (Arsenal 1–2 Charlton Athletic)
13 May 2006 – League Two play-off semi-final first leg (Wycombe 1–2 Cheltenham Town)
10 January 2007 – League Cup semi-final first leg (Wycombe 1–1 Chelsea)
2 May 2009 – Wycombe promoted to Football League One (Wycombe 1–2 Notts County)
7 May 2011 – Wycombe promoted to Football League One (Wycombe 3–1 Southend United)
21 March 2013 – England U21s 3–0 Romania U21s
6 April 2013 – First Super League match at Adams Park (London Broncos 20–46 Bradford)
5 May 2018 – Wycombe's last match in League Two as Wycombe were promoted the week before (Wycombe 1–0 Stevenage)
19 November 2019 – England U20s 3–0 Iceland U20s

See also
 Development of stadiums in English football

References

External links

 Wycombe Wanderers FC

 

Football venues in England
Sports venues in Buckinghamshire
English Football League venues
Women's Super League venues
High Wycombe
Wycombe Wanderers F.C.
Sports venues completed in 1990
Wasps RFC